Raffaelle Castellini (1791–1874) was an Italian artist, who was the director of the Mosaic School at the Vatican, and executed the splendid mosaics of The Sibyl of Cumae after Domenichino and  St. John the Baptist after Guercino for the Basilica of St. Peter's. He died at Rome in 1864. Page 249

References

1864 deaths
Italian artists
1791 births